Gothenburg is a city in Dawson County, Nebraska, United States. It is part of the Lexington, Nebraska Micropolitan Statistical Area. The population was 3,574 at the 2010 census.

History
Gothenburg, Nebraska is named after Gothenburg, Sweden, and is noted for its large number of residents of Swedish descent. Gothenburg, Nebraska, and Gothenburg, Sweden, are believed to be the only two cities named Gothenburg in the world.

Gothenburg was founded in 1882 by Olof Bergstrom. After coming to America from Sweden in 1881, Bergstrom worked for a time on the Union Pacific Railroad, then homesteaded in Dawson County near Gothenburg. He eventually became a land agent for the UP. Bergstrom selected the site that was to become Gothenburg and located a farmstead about a mile north. The Union Pacific Railroad laid out the original town of eight blocks parallel to the railroad tracks. Bergstrom made several return trips to Sweden to lead groups of settlers to Dawson County.

Geography
Gothenburg is located at  (40.931560, -100.159381).

Climate

Demographics

2010 census
At the 2010 census there were 3,574 people in 1,494 households, including 974 families, in the city. The racial makeup of the city was 97.3% White, 0.2% African American, 0.3% Native American, 0.3% Asian, 0.8% from other races, and 1.2% from two or more races. Hispanic or Latino of any race were 4.8%.

Of the 1,494 households 33.5% had children under the age of 18 living with them, 51.7% were married couples living together, 9.8% had a female householder with no husband present, 3.7% had a male householder with no wife present, and 34.8% were non-families. 31.4% of households were one person and 16.1% were one person aged 65 or older. The average household size was 2.34 and the average family size was 2.94.

The median age was 40.4 years. 27.1% of residents were under the age of 18; 5.7% were between the ages of 18 and 24; 22.5% were from 25 to 44; 25.2% were from 45 to 64; and 19.4% were 65 or older. The gender makeup of the city was 47.3% male and 52.7% female.

2000 census
At the 2000 census, there were 3,619 people in 1,457 households, including 989 families, in the city. The population density was 1,422.6 people per square mile (550.1/km). There were 1,575 housing units at an average density of 619.1 per square mile (239.4/km). The racial makeup of the city was 97.37% White, 0.44% African American, 0.33% Native American, 0.17% Asian, 1.22% from other races, and 0.47% from two or more races. Hispanic or Latino of any race were 3.62% of the population. 45.4% were of German, 11.0% Swedish, 10.9% Irish and 8.9% American ancestry according to Census 2000.

Of the 1,457 households 32.3% had children under the age of 18 living with them, 55.0% were married couples living together, 9.7% had a female householder with no husband present, and 32.1% were non-families. 29.2% of households were one person and 15.9% were one person aged 65 or older. The average household size was 2.41 and the average family size was 2.96.

The age distribution was 27.1% under the age of 18, 7.5% from 18 to 24, 24.8% from 25 to 44, 20.8% from 45 to 64, and 19.8% 65 or older. The median age was 38 years. For every 100 females, there were 87.3 males. For every 100 females age 18 and over, there were 84.7 males.

The median household income was $35,990, and the median family income was $40,729. Males had a median income of $31,589 versus $20,162 for females. The per capita income for the city was $17,034. About 6.1% of families and 7.1% of the population were below the poverty line, including 7.0% of those under age 18 and 9.1% of those age 65 or over.

Points of interest

 The Pony Express Trail runs through Gothenburg. There are two original Pony Express Stations in Gothenburg. In 1931, a station located on the Upper 96 Ranch, four miles east of Fort McPherson in Lincoln County, was donated to the city.  The station was moved to Ehmen Park in central Gothenburg.  A second station is still in its original location, on the Lower 96 Ranch four miles south of Gothenburg; it is open to the public on a limited basis.
 Swedish Crosses Cemetery, a cemetery where wrought iron crosses mark the graves of three children of Swedish immigrants is located two miles north and two miles west of Gothenburg. A Nebraska Historical Marker was dedicated in August 1991.
 Wild Horse Golf Club is located northwest of Gothenburg and is infamous for its high winds, fast greens, and "wooga", or the native grass that is used as the second cut. Golf Week Magazine rated it #1 "Best Course Under $50" as well as 21st Best Modern Course in the United States (2007). 
 The Gothenburg Historical Museum, organized in 1980,  contains many historical artifacts from the Dawson County area.
The Sod House Museum was established in Gothenburg in 1988.  The museum stands next to a full-scale replica of an authentic sod house,  together with a barn, windmills and life-sized barbed wire sculptures.
1st State Bank was established in 1906 and has been a stable part of the community for over 100 years; having local ownership the entire time. In 2016 the bank donated $500,000 to the Wellness Center Construction; which helped bring a YMCA to the smallest town in the country.

Notable people
 John B. Curtis, inventor of commercial chewing gum
 Chris Dishman, professional American football player, was born in Gothenburg
 Ben Kuroki, the only Japanese-American to serve in the US Army Air Force in the Pacific during World War II, was born in Gothenburg
 Jay Novacek, professional football player, attended Gothenburg High School
 Louise Odencrantz, social scientist

References

External links
 Gothenburg's Homepage
 Gothenburg Public Schools 
 Gothenburg Times
 Gothenburg Historical Museum
 Pony Express Station Museum

Cities in Nebraska
Cities in Dawson County, Nebraska
Lexington Micropolitan Statistical Area
Pony Express stations